The 1992 Brabantse Pijl was the 32nd edition of the Brabantse Pijl cycle race and was held on 29 March 1992. The race started in Sint-Genesius-Rode and finished in Alsemberg. The race was won by Johan Capiot.

General classification

References

1992
Brabantse Pijl